Piazzale Flaminio is a square in Rome (Italy) and the starting point of the Via Flaminia.

It divides the Flaminio and the Pinciano quarters.

Description 
The square extends just outside the Aurelian Walls. Porta del Popolo, on its south side, connects it to Piazza del Popolo.
On its east side there are the neoclassical propylaea giving access to Villa Borghese, designed by Luigi Canina.

Transports 
  Bus stop (ATAC)
  Metro stop (Flaminio - Piazza del Popolo, line A)
  Railway station (Piazzale Flaminio station)

Image gallery 

Flaminio
Rome Q. I Flaminio